Jacques Balutin is a French actor.

Biography
Jacques Balutin was born on 29 June 1936 in Paris. His real name is William Buenos. He has acted in feature films, TV movies, short films, and as a voice actor.  He is the French voice of Joe Dalton in the Lucky Luke series,

Partial filmography

The Joker (1960) - L'amoureux (uncredited)
The Army Game (1960) - Corporal Bourrache
Candide ou l'optimisme au XXe siècle (1960) - L'ordonnance
Le Miracle des loups (1961) - Un spadassin (uncredited)
La Belle Américaine (1961) - Balutin
Cartouche (1962) - Le moine Capucine
Les Culottes rouges (1962) - Phi-Phi, un chanteur de la troupe
The Trip to Biarritz (1963) - Le reporter
The Flashing Blade (TV series, 1960s)
 Coplan Takes Risks (1964) - Fondane
The Great Spy Chase (1964) - Le douanier (scenes deleted)
Les copains (1965) - Lesueur
What's New Pussycat? (1965) - Etienne
Un milliard dans un billard (1965) - Un agent
Kings of Hearts (1966) - Mac Fish
Asterix and Cleopatra (1968) - Tournevis (voice)
The Devil by the Tail (1969) - Max, un gangster
Delphine (1969) - Le photographe
The Brain (1969) - L'inspecteur Pochet
Erotissimo (1969) - Chauffeur de taxi
Les patates (1969) - P'tit Louis
Appelez-moi Mathilde (1969) - Le brigadier
Tintin and the Temple of the Sun (1969) - Le témoin bègue à st.nazaire (voice)
Atlantic Wall (1970) - Gendarme
Daisy Town (1971) - William Dalton (voice)
La guerre des espions (1972) - Jacques Borgniol-Valchoze
Les Portes de feu (1972) - Soldat de garde
Un cave (1972) - Tunel
Les Joyeux Lurons (1972) - L'abbé Fénelon
Tintin and the Lake of Sharks (1972) - Le gardien du musée (voice)
Le concierge (1973) - Luigi - le serveur
L'Intrépide (1975) - Un contrôleur
Opération Lady Marlène (1975) - Capt. Dubois
The Smurfs and the Magic Flute (1976) - Le buveur (voice)
Le mille-pattes fait des claquettes (1977) - L'inspecteur adjoin
 Parisian Life (1977) - Urbain
La Ballade des Dalton (1978) - William Dalton (voice)
Who Is Killing the Great Chefs of Europe? (1978) - Chappemain
La Cage aux Folles (1978) - (French version, voice)
Sacrés gendarmes (1980) - Le brigadier
The Wonderful Day (1980) - Le galeux
Julien Fontanes, magistrat (1982) - Michel Courban
Ça va pas être triste (1983) - Pivot
C'est facile et ça peut rapporter... 20 ans (1983) - Le commissaire
Mon curé chez les Thaïlandaises (1983) - Hubert McCormick
Flics de choc (1983) - Gilet, le chauffeur du camion
Lucky Luke (1983) - William Dalton (voice)
Babar: The Movie (1989) - Zephir (French version, voice)
Monsieur Papa (2011) - Le concierge (final film role)

References

External links

1936 births
Living people
Male actors from Paris
French male voice actors
French male film actors
French male television actors